Villarrica Airport  is an airport  south of Villarrica in the La Araucanía Region of Chile.

See also

Transport in Chile
List of airports in Chile

References

External links
OpenStreetMap - Villarrica
OurAirports - Villarrica
SkyVector - Villarrica

Airports in Chile
Airports in La Araucanía Region